United Parcel Service (UPS, stylized as ups) is an American multinational shipping & receiving and supply chain management company founded in 1907. Originally known as the American Messenger Company specializing in telegraphs, UPS has grown to become a Fortune 500 company and one of the world's largest shipping couriers. UPS today is primarily known for its ground shipping services as well as the UPS Store, a retail chain which assists UPS shipments and provides tools for small businesses. In addition, UPS offers air shipping on an overnight or two-day basis and delivers to post office boxes through UPS Mail Innovations and UPS SurePost, two services that pass on packages to the United States Postal Service for last-mile delivery.

UPS is the largest courier company in the world by revenue, with annual revenues around US$85 billion in 2020, ahead of competitors DHL and FedEx. UPS' main international hub, UPS Worldport in Louisville, Kentucky, is the fifth busiest airport in the world by cargo traffic based on preliminary statistics from ACI, and the third busiest in the U.S. behind FedEx's Memphis Superhub and Ted Stevens Anchorage International Airport. The company is one of the largest American-owned private employers in the United States.


History

Foundation

On August 28, 1907, James E. Casey founded the American Messenger Company with Claude Ryan in Seattle, Washington, capitalized with $100 in debt. Most deliveries at this time were made on foot and bicycles were used for longer trips.

The American Messenger Company focused primarily on package delivery to retail stores with special delivery mail delivered for its largest client the U.S. Post Office. In 1913, the company acquired a Model T Ford as its first delivery vehicle. Casey and Ryan merged with a competitor, Evert McCabe, and formed Merchants Parcel Delivery. Consolidated delivery was also introduced, combining packages addressed to a certain neighborhood onto one delivery vehicle. In 1916, Charlie Soderstrom joined Merchants Parcel Delivery bringing in more vehicles for the growing delivery business. In 1919, the company expanded for the first time outside of Seattle to Oakland, California, and changed its name to United Parcel Service. The name change to United Parcel Service was to remind the company that expansion operations were still United under the same organization and Parcel identified the type of business offered as part of its Service. Common carrier service was acquired in 1922 from a company in Los Angeles, California. UPS became one of the only companies in the United States to offer common carrier service. At first common carrier was only limited to a small area around Los Angeles but by 1927 expanded to areas up to 125 miles outside the city. In 1924, a conveyor belt system was debuted for the handling of packages for UPS operations.

In 1930, a consolidated service began in New York City, and soon after in other major cities in the East and the Midwest. The use of common carrier for delivery between all customers placed UPS in direct competition with USPS and the Interstate Commerce Commission. The common carrier service was applied in cities where UPS could use the service without the authority of the ICC and state commerce commissions. The first city for UPS to use common carrier status outside California was Chicago, Illinois, in 1953.

Air service through UPS was first used in 1929 through private airlines. However, the Great Depression and a lack of volume ended the air service. In 1953, UPS resumed air service called UPS Blue Label Air with two-day service to major cities along the East Coast and West Coast.

Expansion and diversification
In 1975, UPS moved its headquarters to Greenwich, Connecticut, and began serving all of the 48 contiguous states of the United States. This expansion of operations made UPS the first package delivery company to serve every address in the contiguous United States. Additionally in 1975, UPS went international by establishing operations in Canada. On February 28, UPS Ltd. (later changed to UPS Canada Ltd.) began operations in Toronto, Ontario and today UPS Canada's head office is located in Burlington, Ontario. In 1976, UPS established a domestic operation in West Germany.

UPS Next Day Air Service was launched in 1985 for all 48 contiguous states plus Puerto Rico. In 1988, UPS Airlines was launched with authorization from the Federal Aviation Administration and became the fastest-growing airline in FAA history – currently the 10th largest airline in the United States. Domestic air service was added to Germany in 1989. In 1991, UPS relocated its headquarters to Sandy Springs, Georgia, a suburb of Atlanta. Following this in 1992, UPS acquired both Haulfast and Carryfast and rebranded them UPS Supply Chain Solutions. Haulfast provided the pallet haulage and trucking network for the CarryFast group of companies. By 1993, UPS was delivering up to 11.5 million packages and documents per day.

In order for the company to service the large volume of customers in the 1990s, UPS developed technologies to improve efficiency. A handheld device called "Delivery Information Acquisition Device" (DIAD) was created to record and upload delivery information to the UPS network immediately upon pickup by every UPS driver. In 1992, UPS began tracking all ground shipments electronically. In 1994, UPS.com debuted, and provided an interface to make what was primarily internal operational information available for customer access. After 27 years of providing this information, UPS chose to hide it again for most packages in 2021 and this information is no longer available on their consumer facing website.

In 1995, UPS acquired SonicAir to offer service parts logistics and compete with Choice Logistics. In the same year, UPS launched UPS Logistics Group to facilitate global supply chain management services and consulting for customer needs. In 1997, a walkout by the 185,000 members of the Teamsters shut down UPS for 16 days. In 1998, UPS Capital was established to enable companies to grow their business through a comprehensive menu of integrated financial services through UPS. UPS acquired Challenge Air in 1999 to expand its operations in Latin America.

On November 10, 1999, UPS became a public company in the largest initial public offering of the century.

21st century
In 2001, UPS acquired Mail Boxes Etc., Inc., a franchised network of packing and shipping retail centers across the United States and Canada.  In 2003, the company rebranded the Mail Boxes, Etc. network as The UPS Store.

In 2004, UPS entered the heavy freight business with the purchase of Menlo Worldwide Forwarding, a former subsidiary of Menlo Worldwide; UPS rebranded it as UPS Supply Chain Solutions.  The purchase price was US$150 million and the assumption of US$110 million in long-term debt.

On August 5, 2005, UPS announced that it has completed its acquisition of less-than-truckload (LTL) trucking company Overnite Transportation for US$1.25 billion. This was approved by the FTC and Overnite shareholders on August 4, 2005.  On April 28, 2006, Overnite officially became UPS Freight.

In 2005, UPS offered non-stop delivery service between Guangzhou and the United States. On October 3, 2005, UPS completed the purchase of Lynx Express, one of the largest independent parcel carriers in the United Kingdom, for £55.5 million (US$97.1 million) after receiving approval for the transaction from the European Commission. The first joint package car center operation in Dartford, Kent, was opened in 2006.

On August 28, 2007, United Parcel Service celebrated its 100th anniversary. All Nippon Airways, a Star Alliance member, and UPS formed a cargo alliance and code-share to transport member cargo in 2008, similarly to an airline alliance.

On March 19, 2012, UPS announced that it intended to acquire TNT Express for $6.8 billion, in a move to help expand its presence in European and Asian markets. However, the deal fell through in January 2013, after it was announced that UPS had failed to obtain permission from the European Commission and as such had been blocked on competition grounds.

In February 2012, UPS acquired Brussels-based company Kiala that provides e-commerce retailers the option to have goods delivered to a conventional retail location.

In 2018, The Wall Street Journal reported that UPS's operations were hampered by its outdated 20th-century technology, lagging behind its competitors.

In May 2019, UPS launched a partnership with autonomous trucking startup, TuSimple to carry cargo across Phoenix, Arizona, and Tucson, Arizona.

In October 2019, UPS won the approval of the Federal Aviation Administration to fly drones. The certification will allow UPS to deliver health care supplies using a fleet of drones.

On January 29, 2020, UPS announced it was investing in UK start-up Arrival and ordering 10,000 Generation 2 electric vehicles as a step towards a cleaner, more high-tech fleet. The deal runs from 2020 until 2024 and was reported to be worth more than $400 million.

In March 2020, the company has appointed Carol Tomé to succeed David Abney as its chief executive officer. It was viewed as a move to steer the parcel delivery company through the turbulence of trade wars, technological disruption and the risk of a pandemic-induced recession.

In March 2020, UPS expands its autonomous trips with TuSimple by adding an extra route between Phoenix and El Paso, Texas.

In January 2021, UPS announced it had agreed to sell UPS Freight, its less-than-truckload freight business, to TFI International, a Canadian transport and logistics company, for $800 million. UPS said the move would allow it to focus on small-package delivery. At the time of the sale, UPS Freight had about 14,500 employees, approximately 11,000 of them represented by the Teamsters union, and generated an estimated $3.15 billion in revenue in 2020 offering services across the US, Canada, and Mexico. TFI had reported $4.1 billion in revenue in 2019 and already operated truckload and LTL services in Canada. The acquisition was completed in April and UPS Freight was renamed TForce Freight.

In 2021, following the company's shift to target smaller customers to boost profits during the COVID-19 pandemic, UPS reported a 21% jump in their fourth quarter sales to $24.9 billion. CEO Carol Tomé reported that Amazon paid UPS $11.3 billion in shipping in 2020, accounting for 13.3% of the company's revenue.

In September 2021, UPS entered into an agreement to acquire Roadie for an undisclosed amount with the transaction expected to be closed in the fourth quarter.

In November 2022, it was announced UPS had acquired the healthcare focused, Europe-based warehousing and temperature-controlled transport company, Bomi Group.

Finances 

For the fiscal year 2022, UPS reported earnings of US$11.55 billion, with an annual revenue of US$100.34 billion, an increase of 3% over the previous fiscal cycle. UPS ranked  on the 2022 Fortune 500 list of the largest United States corporations by total revenue.

Operations
UPS's primary business is the time-definite delivery of packages and documents worldwide. In recent years, UPS extended its service portfolio to include LTL transportation (primarily in the U.S.) and supply chain services.
UPS reports its operations in three segments: U.S. Domestic Package operations, International Package operations, and Supply Chain & Freight operations.

United States Domestic Shipping
UPS services for consumers include:

 UPS Ground for day-definite delivery. Can take up to 5 days.
 UPS 3-Day Select for less-sensitive express shipments. This service may use either air or ground transportation depending on distance, demand, and weather conditions, and as noted by its name, can take up to three days.
 UPS 2nd Day Air for packages that must arrive within two days. UPS also offers a 2nd Day Air AM service which offers morning delivery.
 UPS Next Day Air for shipments that require overnight service. UPS splits Next Day Air into three tiers:
 Next Day Air Saver: guaranteed overnight shipping with afternoon delivery
 Next Day Air: guaranteed overnight delivery between 10:30 AM and noon
 Next Day Air Early: guaranteed overnight shipping by 8:30 AM for major US cities and 9:30 AM to most other destinations.
 UPS Express Critical: UPS' fastest service. Delivers to all 50 states, DC, and Puerto Rico by end of day.

UPS also offers UPS SurePost, in which packages are handled by UPS in intermodal transit, and delivered last-mile by USPS.

International Package

International Package operations include delivery to more than 220 countries and territories worldwide, including shipments wholly outside the United States, as well as shipments with either origin or distribution outside the United States.

UPS splits its international shipping into a few services:

 UPS Standard for shipments to Mexico and Canada
 UPS Worldwide Expedited for all international shipments usually delivered within 2-5 business days
 UPS Worldwide Saver, also for all international shipments usually delivered overnight to Canada, 2 Days to Mexico, Latin America, and Europe, and 3 or more days to the rest of the world, all by the end of the day.
 UPS Worldwide Express for more critical international shipments with similar time frames to Worldwide Saver. Delivers around 10:30 AM to Noon.
 UPS Worldwide Express Plus for Worldwide Express shipments that need to arrive to their destination earlier in the morning.

Supply Chain & Freight
Supply Chain & Freight (UPS-SCS for UPS Supply Chain Solutions) includes UPS' forwarding and contract logistics operations and other related business units. UPS' forwarding and logistics business provides services in more than 175 countries and territories worldwide and includes worldwide supply chain design, execution and management, freight forwarding and distribution, customs brokerage, mail and consulting services.

Other business units within this segment include The UPS Store and UPS Capital.

Trailer / railroad reporting marks: UPGX, UPGZ, UPOZ, UPSZ, UPWZ, UPSC, UPSU, NONZ 
NMFTA SCAC code: UPSS, UPSN, UPSC

Until 2021, this segment also included UPS Freight which offered a variety of less than truckload ("LTL") and truckload ("TL") services to customers in North America. UPS Freight was sold to TFI International in April 2021 and was renamed TForce Freight.

Personnel structure
UPS employs approximately 444,000 staff: 362,000 in the U.S. and 82,000 internationally. Approximately 250,000 UPS drivers, package handlers and clerks are represented by the International Brotherhood of Teamsters. During the United Parcel Service strike of 1997, the company's only nationwide strike in its history, which lasted 16 days, Teamster President Ron Carey negotiated a new contract for workers.

Chief executives
1907–1962, James E. "Jim" Casey
1962–1972, George D. Smith
1972–1973, Paul Oberkotter
1973–1980, Harold Oberkotter
1980–1984, George Lamb
1984–1989, John W. Rogers
1989–1996, Kent C. "Oz" Nelson
1997–2001, James P. Kelly
2002–2007, Michael L. "Mike" Eskew
2008–2014, Scott Davis
2014–2020, David Abney
2020–current, Carol B. Tomé

Competitors
Major competitors in the United States include the United States Postal Service (USPS) and FedEx, along with regional carriers such as OnTrac, and LSO (formerly Lonestar Overnight). In addition to these domestic carriers, UPS competes with a variety of international operators, including SF Express, Canada Post (and its subsidiary Purolator), TransForce, Deutsche Post (and its subsidiary DHL), Royal Mail, Japan Post Service, and many other regional carriers, national postal services and air cargo handlers (see Package delivery and Mail pages).

Historically, the bulk of competition for UPS came from inexpensive ground-based delivery services, such as Parcel Post (USPS) or Choice Logistics. In 1998, FedEx expanded into ground parcel delivery through its acquisition of RPS (formerly Roadway Package System), rebranding it as FedEx Ground in 2000. In 2003, DHL acquired Airborne Express, expanding its operations in the United States.

In response to the expansion of FedEx and DHL, UPS partnered with the US Postal Service to offer UPS Mail Innovations, a program that allows UPS to pick up mail and packages weighing under one pound separately from the main ground network and transfer them to a USPS center, or destination delivery unit (DDU), for final distribution. This process is also known as zone skipping, long used by Parcel Consolidators. UPS also has a separate product called "SurePost" which uses the UPS Ground network to deliver packages weighing under 10 pounds to the nearest UPS Package Center, which transfers them to the USPS DDU for "final mile" delivery.

More recently, the continued growth of online shopping, combined with increasing awareness of the role of transportation (including package delivery) on the environment, has contributed to the rise of emerging competition from niche carriers or rebranded incumbents. For instance, the US Postal Service claims "greener delivery" of parcels on the assumption that USPS letter carriers deliver to each US address, six days a week anyway, and therefore offer the industry's lowest fuel consumption per delivery. Other carriers, like ParcelPool.com, which specializes in residential package delivery to APO/FPO addresses, Hawaii, Alaska, Puerto Rico, and other US Territories, arose in response to increased demand from catalog retailers and online e-tailers for low-cost residential delivery services closely matching service standards normally associated with more expensive expedited parcel delivery.

In 2019, UPS sued in an attempt to force USPS to raise their prices, but was rejected by the Supreme Court.

Transportation
UPS operates over 119,000 delivery vehicles worldwide, ranging from bicycles to tractor-trailer trucks. In a long-running company policy to avoid advertisement or endorsement of a vehicle manufacturer, all external manufacturer emblems and badging are removed when a vehicle enters service (whenever possible).

The typical lifespan of a UPS ground vehicle is 20–25 years (or more), lasting until the structural integrity is compromised.  The company does not re-sell any of its ground vehicles, so retired vehicles are almost always stripped of reusable parts before being sent to be crushed/broken up. Prior to scrapping, UPS trucks and trailers have all company branding painted over and are assigned an ADA (Automotive Destruction Authorization) number and must be crushed under the supervision of UPS Automotive personnel, which records the vehicle's destruction.  The only exception to this policy are vehicles taken off the road for internal company use; package cars (repainted white) are used for various purposes (typically at large hubs); older semi tractors sometimes see use as terminal tractors.

Delivery vans
UPS refers to its delivery van as a "package car". Several designs and sizes are used by the company, dependent on routes and package volume; the distinct design of the rounded "bubble-nose" front hood and upper roofline was introduced in 1965.  The bodies of the package cars are manufactured by Morgan Olson (Grumman Olson), Union City Body, and Utilimaster; while older vehicles were based on Ford or General Motors P-chassis, vehicles manufactured in the 21st century use Freightliner or Workhorse chassis.

Until the end of the 20th century, UPS delivery vehicles were equipped with manual transmissions and steering, with automatic transmissions and power steering adopted by newer vehicles.

For lower-volume delivery routes, UPS utilizes production-based vehicles, including minivans (including the Ford Transit Connect or the Ford Transit, and Dodge Grand Caravan C/V) and Mercedes-Benz (Dodge/Freightliner) Sprinter box vans. UPS has ordered Modec electric vans for its UK and German fleets. Energy costs play a huge part in the potential profitability of package delivery companies.

Most UPS Ground vehicles have no air conditioning, with the exception of tractor-trailers. This has been considered to be a contributing factor to heatstroke and other heat-related health problems in drivers who work in these vehicles for the entire shift. Modern vehicles have improved ventilation systems.

On January 29, 2020, UPS invested in Arrival and ordered 10,000 Generation 2 Electric Vehicles.

Bicycles
In 2008, UPS started hiring bicycle delivery personnel in Vancouver, Washington, and in several cities in Oregon (Portland, Salem, Corvallis, Eugene, and Medford). In fall of 2018, UPS announced a new program in Seattle, Washington using pedal-assist electric cargo bikes (made by Portland-based Truck Trike) around Pike Place and other congested downtown areas. In Amsterdam UPS also uses Urban Arrow delivery bicycles for delivery via a granted concession.

Cargo airline 

The fourth-largest cargo airline worldwide, UPS Airlines flies to over 800 destinations worldwide (the most of any airline, cargo or passenger).  Formed in 1988, the airline is headquartered in Louisville, Kentucky (home to Worldport, its worldwide air hub) with additional hubs in the United States located in Ontario, California, Dallas, Texas, Rockford, Illinois and Philadelphia.  Outside of North America, a hub in Cologne, Germany services Europe; in Asia, UPS Airlines operates a facility in Hong Kong and two hubs in mainland China.

Consisting of a fleet of over 260 aircraft, the airline competes directly against FedEx Express, facilitating air shipments by the company in over 200 countries and territories worldwide.

Cargo drone airline 

UPS Flight Forward is a subsidiary which was formed in July 2019 and approved by FAA for Part 135 Standard certification, first ever to receive this specific type of certification. The FAA's Part 135 Standard certification allows company to operate an unlimited number of drones of any size (even allowing the cargo to exceed 55 pounds) even at with an unlimited number of remote operators in command.

Company brand

Brown
The brown color that UPS uses on its vehicles and uniforms is called Pullman brown. Company founder James E. Casey originally wanted company vehicles to use a yellow paint scheme, but one of his partners, Charlie Soderstrom, stated that a yellow vehicle would be hard to keep clean and that Pullman railroad cars were brown for just that reason.

During the 2000s, the company used the familiarity of its color scheme in an advertising slogan: "What can Brown do for you?"

Font
UPS commissioned brand consultancy FutureBrand to develop its own font, UPS Sans, for use in marketing and communication material. UPS Sans was created by slightly altering certain parts of FSI FontShop International's font FF Dax without permission. This has resulted in an agreement between FSI FontShop International and FutureBrand to avoid litigation.

Reputation

UPS has been criticized for its treatment of its workforce, including providing inadequate protections and sick leave during the COVID-19 pandemic.

The company has also been subject to perennial criticism for damaged, late, or otherwise mishandled packages.

Safe streets activists have attacked UPS, along with other parcel delivery services, for frequently illegally parking their vehicles in bike lanes while making deliveries, a practice that endangers cyclists. They were sued over it in New York in 2015, and criticized alongside peers in a letter from Washington, D.C.'s transportation agency in 2018.

Environmental record
As of 2013, UPS has over 104,900 vehicles in operation worldwide including nearly 7,000 alternative fuel vehicles. In May 2008, UPS placed an order for 200 hybrid electric vehicles (adding to the 50 it had at that point) and 300 compressed natural gas (which are 20% more fuel efficient, and add to the 800 it already has) vehicles from Daimler Trucks North America. The company added 200 hybrid electric vehicles to its fleet in 2016.

UPS received a "striding" rating of 80 points out of 100 totals on the environmental scorecard by the Climate Counts Group for its efforts to lessen the company's impact on the environment. UPS has also been awarded the Clean Air Excellence Award by the United States Environmental Protection Agency because of the alternative fuel program it has developed. A few years later, the Environmental Protection Agency fined the UPS for not following environmental laws.

In October 2009, UPS became the first small-package carrier to offer customers the chance to buy carbon offsets to neutralize the greenhouse gas emissions generated by the transport of their packages. Although initially only available on ups.com and to high-volume shippers, they are now widely available through UPS shipping systems and UPS Ready third-party shipping systems.

Carbon footprint
UPS reported Total CO2e emissions (Direct + Indirect) for the twelve months ending 31 December 2020 at 16,500 Kt (+1,546/+10% y-o-y). UPS aims to reach net zero emissions by 2050.

See also

Big Brown – 2008 Kentucky Derby and Preakness Stakes winner; named after the company
MaxiCode – A UPS developed and utilized square barcode-like symbol that appears on their package label

References

Further reading

Brewster, Mike and Frederick Dalzell. Driving Change: The UPS Approach to Business (2007) excerpt and text search
Thomas L. Friedman, "Insourcing," in The World Is Flat: A Brief History of the Twenty-First Century, New York: Farrar, Straus and Giroux, updated and expanded, 2006, pp. 167–176.
Minchin, Timothy J. "Shutting Down 'Big Brown': Reassessing the 1997 UPS Strike and the Fate of American Labor," Labor History, 53 (Nov. 2012), 541–60.
Niemann, Greg. Big Brown: The Untold Story of UPS. New York: John Wiley & Sons, 2007.

External links

 
Companies listed on the New York Stock Exchange
Companies in the Dow Jones Transportation Average
Companies based in Sandy Springs, Georgia
Transport companies established in 1907
Express mail
Logistics companies of the United States
Trucking companies of the United States
1999 initial public offerings
1907 establishments in Washington (state)
Multinational companies headquartered in the United States
American companies established in 1907
Transportation companies based in Washington (state)
Transportation companies based in Georgia (U.S. state)